O'Higgins is a  department of Chaco Province in Argentina.

The provincial subdivision has a population of about 19,000 inhabitants in an area of  1,580 km², and its capital city is San Bernardo, which is located around 190 km from the provincial capital.

Settlements
La Clotilde
La Tigra
San Bernardo (capital)

References

Departments of Chaco Province